Megachile rottnestensis is a species of bee in the family Megachilidae. It was described by Rayment in 1934.

References

Rottnestensis
Insects described in 1934